Miles in Tokyo is a live album recorded on July 14, 1964, by the Miles Davis Quintet at the Tokyo Kōsei Nenkin Kaikan, Shinjuku, Tokyo, Japan. It was released in the United States on CD in 2005 and is the first recording of Davis in Japan. It is the only album to showcase an early incarnation of his Second Great Quintet featuring Sam Rivers on tenor saxophone, following George Coleman's departure; after this, Wayne Shorter's appointment completed the classic lineup which recorded such albums as ESP and Miles Smiles, through to Miles in the Sky.

Track listing

Original LP track List

Side A (23:03) 
 "Introduction by Teruo Isono"
 "If I Were a Bell" (Frank Loesser) – 10:18
 "My Funny Valentine" (Richard Rodgers, Lorenz Hart) – 12:45

Side B (28:11) 
 "So What" (Miles Davis) – 7:50
 "Walkin'" (Richard H. Carpenter) – 9:11
 "All of You" (Cole Porter) – 11:10
 "Theme and Announcement"

Reissue CD (COL 519507 2, 2005) 
 "Introduction by Teruo Isono" - 1:10
 "If I Were a Bell" (Frank Loesser) – 10:14
 "My Funny Valentine" (Richard Rodgers, Lorenz Hart) – 12:45
 "So What" (Miles Davis) – 8:02
 "Walkin'" (Richard H. Carpenter) – 9:11
 "All of You" (Cole Porter) – 11:18
 "Go-Go [Theme] + closing announcement" (Miles Davis) - (1:19)

Personnel 
 Miles Davis – trumpet
 Sam Rivers – tenor saxophone
 Herbie Hancock – piano
 Ron Carter – acoustic bass
 Tony Williams – drums

Production

Original LP 
 Recording Producer - Kiyoshi Itoh
 Recording Engineer - Kenichi Handa, Nippon Broadcasting System, Inc.
 Cover Photography - Akiyoshi Miyashita
 Album Design - Mituru Yamada, Kiyoshi Itoh

Reissue CD(COL 519507 2, 2005) 
 Reissue Producer - Michael Cuscuna and Bob Belden
 Remastered - Mark Wilder at Sony Music Studios, New York, NY.
 Project Director - Seth Rothstein
 Legacy A&R - Steve Berkowitz
 A&R Coordination - Stacey Boyle
 Reissue Art Direction - Howard Fritzson
 Reissue Design - Randall Martin
 Photography - Akiyoshi Miyashita
 Packaging Manager - Norm Elrod
 Liner Note - Takao Ogawa

References 

Albums produced by Michael Cuscuna
Albums produced by Bob Belden
Miles Davis live albums
1969 live albums
Columbia Records live albums
Sony Music live albums